Delf may refer to:

, in Delfzijl, Netherlands
Barrie Delf (born 1961), English professional footballer
Marion Delf-Smith (1883-1980), British botanist whose author abbreviation is "Delf"
 DELF - Diplôme d'études en langue française - a certification of French language abilities

See also
Delfs, a surname
Delph (disambiguation)

English-language surnames